"Don't Stop the Party" is a song recorded by American rapper Pitbull for his seventh studio album, Global Warming. The song features TJR and includes samples of the song "Funky Kingston" by Toots and the Maytals replayed by Mark Summers at Scorccio Sample Replays. It was released on September 25, 2012, as the album's third single by RCA Records.

The song was written by Pitbull, TJR, José García, Jorge Gomez Martinez, Warwick Lyn, and Frederick Hibbert, and it was produced by Rozdilsky under his stage name TJR, with additional production by Scottish house producer Chris Lake. Rozdilsky had previously written the song as "Funky Vodka", which caught Pitbull's attention. It has peaked at number 17 on the US Billboard Hot 100.

Background and composition
The song was originally titled "Funky Vodka" as written by TJR. It was played heavily at the Miami Winter Music Conference and caught the attention of Pitbull, who asked TJR to work with him for it to be a single from Global Warming.

Speaking about the viral success of the track, TJR has stated: "Funky Vodka is probably the track I'm most proud of. It was pretty cool to see an old school sample-based house tune make it to the overall number one spot on Beatport." "Funky Vodka" itself is based around the Jamaican reggae classic "Funky Kingston" (1973) by Toots and the Maytals. The sample replay of "Funky Kingston" was produced by Mark Summers at Scorccio Sample Replays. "Don't Stop the Party" is a hip house song, which has a running time of three minutes and twenty-six seconds (3:26) and an upbeat tempo of 127 beats per minute. The single version was written by TJR, Pitbull, Bigram Zayas, and Frederick "Toots" Hibbert. Marc Kinchen, TJR and DJ Buddha served as producers.

Critical reception
Alexandra Capotorto of PopCrush said that the song "leaves something to be desired, since it’s super repetitive." It peaked at seventeen on the Billboard Hot 100. It reached number seven on the UK Singles Chart, and also managed to crack the top ten in Austria and Canada. In Australia, "Don't Stop The Party" debuted at twenty-three on October 8, 2012. The following week, it peaked at fifteen. In New Zealand, it debuted at thirty-seven on October 15; the following week it peaked at twenty-three. To date, it has peaked at sixteen on the Billboard Mainstream Pop Songs chart. Additionally, it broke into the top-twenty of the Billboard Hot Rap Songs chart, reaching five.

Use in media 
Darts player Peter Wright dances to the song during his walk-on.

"Don't Stop the Party" was used the promos of VH1 Latin America NEO: Musica Nueva. and in Chile, the song was used the promo of Telecanal A las 11 and credits of TVN's Juga2, and several episodes of Wena profe. The song was also played in the movies Last Vegas, About Last Night, and Despicable Me 2.

Until 2015, Florida Panthers of the National Hockey League use "Don't Stop the Party" as their celebratory goal song at the BB&T Center, though they have since switched it to their victory song.

Until 2016, The St. Louis Blues of the National Hockey League use "Don't Stop the Party" as their team win song when they win a game at the Scottrade Center

Since 2015, Orlando Solar Bears of the ECHL use "Don't Stop the Party" as the goal song at the Amway Center

The Los Angeles Chargers of the National Football League began using the song in 2014 as their celebratory touchdown song at Qualcomm Stadium, and kept it as their song when they moved to the StubHub Center.

Since 2015, the song has been used in the background during competitions on Ant & Dec's Saturday Night Takeaway.

The Flophouse Commissie 16/17 also used this song as their walk-on song.

The Canada men's national junior ice hockey team used the song as their celebratory goal song in the 2019 World Junior Ice Hockey Championships.

The Chicago White Sox Major League Baseball team play the song after every White Sox home run at Guaranteed Rate Field.

The song was used for the opening number of Miss Universe 2020.

Music video 
The music video was first released onto Pitbull's official Vevo channel on October 26, 2012, and was directed by David Rosseau. It features Pitbull on a yacht with several people drinking vodka, as well as naked women, including porn star Kennedy Leigh and model Claudia Sampedro, with materials placed in necessary places. The video has received over 81 million views.

Live performances 
Pitbull performed "Don't Stop The Party" at the 2012 MTV Europe Music Awards on November 11, 2012, in Frankfurt, Germany. Alexandra Capotorto noted that Pitbull: "looked like he was straight off the set of a Men in Black film during his performance." He was dressed in black with a white shirt underneath a pair of his signature dark sunglasses. Capotorto said: "he entertained the crowd with his song — and leave it to the master to have background dancers in the form of beautiful women dressed in tight white bodysuits and white wigs." He also performed it at the Latin Grammy Awards of 2012 at the Mandalay Bay Events Center on November 15. He also performed it at the 2012 American Music Awards. He also performed the song at the IPL 6 Opening Ceremony at Kolkata, India.

Formats and track listings
 Digital download
 "Don't Stop the Party" (featuring TJR) – 3:26

CD single
 "Don't Stop the Party" (featuring TJR) – 3:26
 "I Like (The Remix)" (featuring Enrique Iglesias and Afrojack) – 3:37

Credits and personnel
Credits adapted from the single's official liner notes.

 Armando C. Perez – vocals, songwriter
 Bigram Zayas – songwriter
 Frederick "Toots" Hibbert – songwriter
 Marc Kinchen – songwriter, record producer
 Urales "DJ Buddha" Vargas – songwriter, record producer
 TJR – vocals, songwriter

Charts

Weekly charts

Year-end charts

Certifications

Release history

References

External links
 
 
 

Songs about parties
2012 singles
Pitbull (rapper) songs
Spanglish songs
Eurodance songs
Songs written by Pitbull (rapper)
RCA Records singles
Songs written by Toots Hibbert
2012 songs